The Witness Chair is a 1936 courtroom drama film directed by George Nicholls, Jr. and starring Ann Harding and Walter Abel.

Plot 
Late one night, secretary Paula Young (Ann Harding) leaves the office of her boss, Stanley Whittaker (Douglas Dumbrille, locking the door and taking the stairs to avoid being seen by the elevator operator (Frank Jenks). The next morning, the cleaning lady finds Whittaker's dead body, an apparent suicide. Police Lieutenant Poole (Moroni Olsen) finds a letter signed by Whittaker in which the deceased states he embezzled $75,000. Soon, however, he suspects otherwise and, after investigating, arrests widower James "Jim" Trent (Walter Abel), the vice president of Whittaker Textile Corporation. The gun that fired the fatal shot belongs to Trent, and the typewritten suicide note, though signed by Whittaker, specifically states that Trent is not involved in the embezzlement.

The trial goes badly for the defendant. The elevator operator recalls seeing only  Whittaker and Trent in the office building that night, and Martin (Paul Harvey), the prosecuting attorney, produces a possible strong motive: Trent's daughter Connie intended to run away with Whittaker that night. However, Paula interrupts the proceedings to claim responsibility for the crime. She had guessed that Whittaker intended to flee the country with Connie (she being unaware of his embezzlement) when two ship tickets were delivered to the office. With strong, concealed feelings for Trent, Paula forced Whittaker at gunpoint to sign the confession she had typed. However, Whittaker then tried to grab the gun, only to be fatally shot in the struggle. Trent asks Paula to marry him.

Cast
 Ann Harding as Paula Young  
 Walter Abel as James "Jim" Trent  
 Douglass Dumbrille as Stanley Whittaker  
 Frances Sage as Constance "Connie" Trent  
 Moroni Olsen as Police Lieutenant Poole  
 Margaret Hamilton as Grace Franklin, the bookkeeper  
 Maxine Jennings as Tillie Jones, Trent's secretary  
 William 'Billy' Benedict as Benny Ryan, the office boy  
 Paul Harvey as Prosecuting Attorney Martin  
 Murray Kinnell as Defense Attorney Conrick  
 Charles Arnt as Mr. Henshaw, the auditor  
 Frank Jenks as Roy Levino, the elevator operator

Critical reception
The New York Times dismissed it as "a lugubrious and mediocre film;" while more recently Noirish called it a "very interesting B-movie," writing that "The Witness Chair is no hidden classic, but it’s a movie far better and certainly far more intriguing than its obscurity might suggest."

References

External links 
 
 
 

American romantic drama films
American black-and-white films
American courtroom films
RKO Pictures films
Films directed by George Nicholls Jr.
1936 romantic drama films
1936 films
1930s American films